General elections were held in the Solomon Islands between mid-May and mid-June 1967.

Background
At the time of the 1965 elections, the Legislative Council had 22 members; the Governor, 11 'official' members (civil servants) and 10 'unofficial' members, of which seven were elected by regional councils, two appointed by the Governor and one directly elected in Honiara.

Prior to the 1967 elections, the membership was increased to 29, with three ex officio members, twelve officials and fourteen elected members. Thirteen of the elected members were directly-elected, whilst the Eastern Outer Islands seat was indirectly elected by an electoral college.

Results
From a possible electorate of 64,033, only 39,101 people registered to vote, of which 17,689 voted (45.2%).

References

1967 in the Solomon Islands
Elections in the Solomon Islands
Solomon
Legislative Council of the Solomon Islands
Solomon
Solomon
Election and referendum articles with incomplete results